Çağla Yaman, aka Çağla Yılmaz, (born April 1, 1981) is a Turkish women's handballer, who plays in the Turkish Women's Handball Super League for İzmir BB GSK, and the Turkey national team. The -tall sportswoman plays in the center back position.

Playing career

Club
She played in her hometown for Üsküdar Belediyespor between 2001 and 2004 before she moved to Romania and signed with CS Rulmentul Brasov for the 2006–07 season. After one season, she returned home and rejoined her former team Üsküdar Belediyespor. In the 2008–09 season, she transferred to İzmir BB GSK. Yaman returned to her main team Üsküdar Belediyespor again after one season. In the 2013–14 season, she was with Muratpaşa Bld. SK im Antalya. She transferred in 2014 to İzmir BB GSK again.

In November 2007, Turkey Handball Federation's Disciplinary Committee imposed on Çağla Yaman a penalty of six months for failing to attend the national team's camp grounds without notice.

She took part at the Women's EHF Challenge Cup (2001–02, 2008–09, 2012–13, 2014–15 and 2015–16), Women's EHF Cup (2002–03, 2006–07 and 2007–08), Women's EHF Cup Winners' Cup (2003–04, 2009–10, 2010–11, 2011–12 and 2013–14) as well as Women's EHF Champions League (2006–07, 2011–12 and 2013–14).

International
Çağla Yaman is part of the Turkey women's national handball team.

She was also member of the Turkey women's national beach handball team.

Honours
Turkish Women's Handball Super League
 Winners (3): 2003–04, 2010–11, 2013–14
 Runners-up (4): 2007–08, 2009–10, 2011–12, 2012–13

References 

1981 births
Sportspeople from Istanbul
Turkish female handball players
Turkish beach handball players
Expatriate handball players
Turkish expatriate sportspeople in Romania
Üsküdar Belediyespor players
İzmir Büyükşehir Belediyespor handball players
Muratpaşa Bld. SK (women's handball) players
Turkey women's national handball players
Living people
21st-century Turkish women